Mustafa Osman Alibegu, OSK, (1893, Ulqin – December 25, 1977, Shkodër) known as Cafo Beg Ulqini, was a maritime sailor, politician and Albanian patriot.  He served as the first Albanian mayor of Ulcinj for two decades, and deputy of Ulcinj in the Albanian Parliament. He was a member of the Supreme Council of Regency (appointed by Germany) in 1944.
On April 16, 2016, he was  posthumously recognized by Albanian President, Bujar Nishani, with the title "Knight of the Order of Skanderbeg.

Honours

 Order of Skanderbeg (Albania, 26 April 2016) – decorated by President of Albania Bujar Nishani):  Knight of the Order of Skanderbeg

References

Mayors of places in Albania
Recipients of the Order of Skanderbeg (1990–)
1893 births
1977 deaths
People from Ulcinj
Albanians in Montenegro
Albanian collaborators with Fascist Italy
Albanian collaborators with Nazi Germany